Alexander Turnbull may refer to:

Alexander Turnbull (lacrosse) (1872–1956), Canadian lacrosse player
Alexander Turnbull (bibliophile) (1868–1918), founder of the Alexander Turnbull Library, now held as part of the National Library of New Zealand
Alexander Douglas Turnbull (1903–1993), politician in British Columbia, Canada
Sandy Turnbull (Alexander Turnbull, 1884–1917), Scottish football player